Barcelona Futebol Clube, commonly referred to as Barcelona-RO, or simply Barcelona, is a Brazilian football club based in Vilhena, Rondônia.

As of 2022, Barcelona is the fourth-best ranked team from Rondônia in CBF's national club ranking, being placed 157th overall.

History
Initially a club from Vitória da União, Corumbiara, Barcelona started playing in amateur competitions in 1995. In 2012, the club moved to Vilhena, and turned professional on 7 October 2016.

Barcelona played its first professional competition (Campeonato Rondoniense) in 2017, and finished second after losing the finals to Real Ariquemes; the club also qualified to the following year's Campeonato Brasileiro Série D.

Achievements and Honours
Campeonato Rondoniense
Runners-up 2x: 2017, 2018
Série D:
Participation 2x: 2018, 2019

References

External links
Série D team profile 
Ogol team profile 

Association football clubs established in 2016
2016 establishments in Brazil
Football clubs in Rondônia